Juliane Bogner-Strauß, (born 3 November 1971) is an Austrian molecular biologist, biochemist, and politician in the Austrian People's Party (ÖVP). Since October 2013 she is Associate Professor at the Institute of Biochemistry of Graz University of Technology.  From 18 December 2017 she was Federal Minister for Families and Youth of the Republic of Austria, since 8 January 2018 she is Federal Minister for Women, Families and Youth in the Federal Chancellery. Since 9 July 2018, she is the Federal Minister for Sustainability and Tourism.

Life 
From 1992 she studied chemistry at the University of Graz, graduating in 1999 with a master's degree. This was followed by a doctoral degree at the Institute of Molecular Biosciences at the University of Graz, where she earned her doctorate in 2002 under Rudolf Zechner and subsequently worked as a university assistant until 2005. In 2005 she moved to Graz University of Technology as assistant professor at the Institute for Genomics and Bioinformatics. In 2008 she qualified as a professor in the field of genomics and molecular biology. In 2010 she became associate professor and deputy director of the institute. In October 2013 she became Associate Professor and Deputy Director of the Institute of Biochemistry. Since June 2018 she has been a supporter of the Strong Women, Strong hearts initiative, founded in 2017, for education about cardiovascular diseases.

Politics 
In the 2017 Austrian legislative election, she ran as a newcomer for the Styrian People's Party on the third list of the state list. From 9 November 2017 to 22 January 2018, she was a member of the Austrian National Council. Since 18 December 2017, she has been a member of the Federal Government for short as Minister for Women, Family and Youth. In the National Council she followed  Josef Smolle on 24 January 2018. Josef Smolle. From 8 July 2018, Bogner-Strauß represented the Federal Minister for Sustainability and Tourism, Elisabeth Köstinger, when she went on parental leave for six weeks. Since October 2017, she has been a member of the Styrian VP-Employee Alliance and, since November 2017, a member of the Styrian VP Women.

References 

Members of the National Council (Austria)
University of Graz alumni
Austrian biochemists
1971 births
Academic staff of the Graz University of Technology
Austrian molecular biologists
Austrian People's Party politicians
Living people
21st-century Austrian women politicians
21st-century Austrian politicians